Levon Babujian (born May 8, 1986 in Yerevan) is an Armenian chess Grandmaster.

He attended the Armenian State Institute of Physical Culture and Sport and is the director of a chess school in the Malatia-Sebastia District of Yerevan.

In April 2006 Levon Babujian achieved the title of International Master (IM). He is a Grandmaster (GM) since January 2010.

Tournamtents
2008 Shared second-third at Vasylyshyn Memorial
2009 First at Istanbul
2011 Won the 81st Yerevan City Chess Championship
2011 Shared second-sixth in the 4th Karen Asrian Memorial in Jermuk
2012 Third in the Armenian Chess960 Championship.
2019 First at the Kazakhstan Cup Final.

References

External links

1986 births
Living people
Sportspeople from Yerevan
Chess grandmasters
Armenian chess players